Bruce J. MacFadden is an American vertebrate paleontologist, a significant figure in his field, currently a Distinguished Professor at University of Florida.

References

University of Florida faculty
American paleontologists
Living people
Year of birth missing (living people)